The following is a summary of Derry county hurling team's 2008 season.

2008 National Hurling League

Championship

2008 Ulster Senior Hurling Championship

Christy Ring Cup

External links
Derry GAA official website
Senior County Hurling 2008 on Derry GAA official website

Season Derry
Hurling Derry
Derry county hurling team seasons